Long Hill Township is one of fifteen townships in Surry County, North Carolina, United States. The township had a population of 1,495 according to the 2000 census.

Geographically, Long Hill Township occupies  in eastern Surry County.  Long Hill Township is separated from Eldora Township on the west by the Ararat River.  There are no incorporated municipalities within Long Hill Township, however there are several smaller, unincorporated communities located here, including, Ararat and Long Hill.

Townships in Surry County, North Carolina
Townships in North Carolina